The Al Abadi government was approved by the Assembly on 8 September 2014, following the general election in April 2014. The names of thirty five ministers were approved, with the defense and interior ministries not yet filled.  On 18 October 2014, the Iraq parliament named Khaled al-Obaidi, a member of parliament's Sunni Arab Itihad al-Quwa al-Wataniyah bloc as defense minister, and Mohammed Al-Ghabban, a member of the Shiite Badr bloc, as interior minister. In August 2015, following popular protests against corruption and lack of services, backed by senior cleric Ali al-Sistani, the Prime Minister reduced the cabinet to 22 members.

References

External links

Cabinets of Iraq